Vernation (from vernal meaning spring, since that is when leaves spring forth in temperate regions) is the formation of new leaves or fronds. In plant anatomy, it is the arrangement of leaves in a bud.

In pine species, new leaves are short and encased in sheaths. Each leaf bundle consists of 2 to 5 needles. All the leaves on one section of branch grow in length together. In cabbage species, new leaves are folded over, each covered by the previous leaf.

Circinate vernation

Circinate vernation is the manner in which most fern fronds emerge.  As the fern frond is formed, it is  tightly curled so that the tender growing tip of the frond (and each subdivision of the frond) is protected within a coil. At this stage it is called a crozier (after the shepherd's crook) or fiddlehead (after the scrollwork at the top of a violin). As the lower parts of the frond expand and toughen up, they begin to photosynthesize, supporting the further growth and expansion of the frond. By photosynthesizing, the frond increases the amount of solute inside the frond, which lowers the internal water gradient and facilitates an increase in volume that forces uncoiling. In the case of many fronds, long hairs or scales provide additional protection to the growing tips before they are fully uncoiled. Circinate vernation may also be observed in the extension of leaflets, in the compound leaves of cycads. Circinate vernation is also typical of the carnivorous plant family Droseraceae, for example see this photo of  Drosera filiformis. It is also seen in the related genera Drosophyllum and Triphyophyllum, and in the much more distantly related Byblis; however in these three genera, the leaves are coiled outwards towards the abaxial surface of the leaf (reverse circinate vernation): this appears to be unique to these three plants among the angiosperms.

Convolute vernation

The process of convolute vernation involves the wrapping of one margin of the leaf's blade over the other. This folding mechanism makes the emerging leaf look like a tube.

Involute vernation

In involute vernation both margins on opposing sides of the leaf are rolled up towards the upper (axial) surface of the leaf, forming two tubes that may meet at the midrib of the leaf.

Revolute vernation
Revolute vernation is the opposite of involute vernation: the margins of the leaf are rolled up towards the under (abaxial) surface of the leaf.

See also 
 Aestivation — the way in which the petals and sepals of a flower are arranged in a bud.
 Ptyxis — the way an individual leaf is folded within a bud.

References

Plant morphology